Karen L. Green is an American artist. Her book Bough Down won the Believer Poetry Award.

She was married to author David Foster Wallace from 2004 until his death in 2008.

Books
 Bough Down (2013)
Frail Sister (2018)
 Voices from La Frontera: Pioneer Women from the Big Bend Tell Their Stories (2002)

References

Living people
Year of birth missing (living people)
20th-century American painters
American women poets
American women painters
21st-century American women artists
21st-century American painters
20th-century American women